Tambelin railway station is located on the Gawler line.

History
The sign for Tambelin was erected by the S.A.Railways at a new stopping place near what was then known as the "23-mile crossing" in 1947. The name had not previously been a locality name in the area that had been known as Gawler Blocks. The name Tambelin was chosen by the S.A.R. after consulting the South Australian Nomenclature Committee, as a native name meaning "selecting".

Prior to 1986, Tambelin station had short step-down platforms on the northern side of Clark Road; the present station was built in 1986 on the south side of Clark Road. It has an unsealed carpark and serves Trinity College via a footpath underneath the Gawler Bypass.

Services by platform

References

Railway stations in Adelaide